Leonard Frank "Comet" Haley (born September 15, 1931) is a Canadian retired ice hockey player who played 30 games in the National Hockey League with the Detroit Red Wings during the 1959–60 and 1960–61 seasons. The rest of his career, which lasted from 1951 to 1972, was mainly spent in the minor Western Hockey League.

Career statistics

Regular season and playoffs

External links
 

1931 births
Living people
Brandon Regals players
Canadian ice hockey left wingers
Detroit Red Wings players
Edmonton Flyers (WHL) players
Hershey Bears players
New Haven Blades players
Omaha Knights (CHL) players
Omaha Knights (USHL) players
San Diego Gulls (WHL) players
San Francisco Seals (ice hockey) players
Saskatoon Quakers players
Seattle Totems (WHL) players
Ice hockey people from Edmonton
Tulsa Oilers (1964–1984) players